Ovruchsky Uyezd (Овручский уезд) was one of the subdivisions of the Volhynian Governorate of the Russian Empire. It was situated in the northeastern part of the governorate. Its administrative centre was Ovruch.

Demographics
At the time of the Russian Empire Census of 1897, Ovruchsky Uyezd had a population of 205,390. Of these, 83.4% spoke Ukrainian, 10.6% Yiddish, 2.6% Russian, 1.3% Polish, 1.2% German, 0.5% Belarusian and 0.3% Czech as their native language.

References

 
Uezds of Volhynian Governorate
Volhynian Governorate